The 1895 Ole Miss Rebels football team represented the University of Mississippi as an independent during the 1895 college football season. Led by H. L. Fairbanks in his first and only season as head coach, Ole Miss compiled a record of 4–1. The game against LSU was cancelled.

Schedule

References

Ole Miss
Ole Miss Rebels football seasons
Ole Miss Rebels football